Torud (also Romanized as Ţorūd and Tūrūt) is a village in Poshtkuh Rural District of the Central District of Firuzkuh County, Tehran province, Iran. At the 2006 National Census, its population was 663 in 173 households. The following census in 2011 counted 787 people in 258 households. The latest census in 2016 showed a population of 458 people in 162 households; it was the largest village in its rural district.

References 

Firuzkuh County

Populated places in Tehran Province

Populated places in Firuzkuh County